Saymaluu-Tash (meaning 'embroidered' or 'patterned stones' in Kyrgyz) is a petroglyph site and a national park in Jalal-Abad Region, Kyrgyzstan, south of Kazarman.  Over 10,000 carved pictures—and perhaps as many as 11,000—which are black-and-white rock paintings, have so far been identified, making the site a globally important collection of rock art. They are a sacred display of offerings of the ancient people of the lower valley.

Protection

The site was proposed for listing under the UNESCO List of World Heritage Sites by the Kyrgyz National Commission for UNESCO on 29 January 2001. It is listed under the UNESCO's Tentative List as "Saimaly-Tash Petroglyphs" for inscription under Cultural Category under Criteria: (iii), (iv) and (vi).

Location
From Kazarman village for a short distance there is a road on which only jeeps can ply but the rest of the way to the site can be reached in about a day on foot or horseback, but only around the month of August. It is a strenuous climb. At other times, snow conditions make it impractical to reach. The trek involves three days by jeep and seven days by horse.

The nature park is crossed by a number of rivers that spring from the Fergana Range, including Kyldoo, Kök-Art and Kongur-Döbö (Naryn basin).

Etymology
The meaning of 'Saymaluu-Tash'  in Kyrgyz language is "place of patterned or embroidered stone".

History
The petroglyphs created in large galleries are thought to date from the early 2000 BC to 3000 BC of the Neolithic and Bronze Ages, and up into the Middle Ages (8th century AD). Bronze Age settlers had a sacred tradition of inscribing petroglyph.  This continued during the Iron Age from 800 BC, and variants persevered for several hundred years to the medieval period, when Scythian and Turkic people did it.

It is also said that from 8th century BC to first century AD, Saka-Usun period prior to the Kyrgyz, people settled here. The Saka priests used this site for sacrificial rites to the sun god and their settlements are said to be submerged in the Cholpon-Ata bay. The site was sacred to the people of Tien Shan and Pre Ferghana, and is even now sacred to the modern generation of Kyrgizians for spiritual and healing qualities. It is part of the spiritual ethos of the peoples' "religious beliefs and their worship of mountains, nature, totems and solar cosmic images." The site was first recognized by Russian cartographers in 1902 when they were carrying out surveys in the area for a road project to link a military camp between Jalal-Abad and Naryn; this road is now in use via Kazaeman. One of the cartographers, Nikolai Khludov, who had heard tales from a shepherd of "painted stones" in close vicinity to their camp, decided to examine the site with a team of surveyors. He reported his findings of the petroglyphs to the Archaeological Society of Tashkent. This society then mounted an expedition to further examine the site. However, the site was forgotten until 1950.  After an excavation was conducted, the petroglyphs were specifically identified, numbered and their age determined. It is now under sporadic investigation by the Institute of Archaeology in Bishkek. Neolithic age petroglyphs are on display in the Kyrgyz State Historical Museum.

Features
Archaeologists have bifurcated the site, calling the parts "Saimaluu-Tash 1" and "Saimaluu-Tash 2." 

It is believed that they were "votive offerings" brought from the lower valleys. There is a small lake here where shamans used to perform sacred rites. Petroglyphs of several designs at this site have been identified on stones. The most common designs are animals like ibex (the long-horned ibex of the Turkish era was more frequent), horses, lions, and wolves. Another common drawing is of hunting scenes of deer, large antlers in particular; in this scene the hunters are shown using bows, arrows, and spears to hunt the animals. Agricultural operations such as tilling the land were a common theme. Other scenes are of ritual dances, the sun, wavy designs representing the flow of rivers, and sexual scenes. The artists perhaps portrayed their feelings of gratitude to the spirits of the mountain after a good crop or a successful hunting expedition.

References

Bibliography

External links
 About Saimaluu Tash at a local Tour operator's site
 Saimaluu Tash submission in 2001 at the UNESCO

Protected areas established in 2001
National parks of Kyrgyzstan
Rock art in Asia